Pteris comans is a fern from eastern Australia and New Zealand. The habitat of the hairy bracken or netted brake is rainforest or moist open forest. The botanist Johann Georg Adam Forster published this plant in Halle, the year 1786, in his Florulae Insularum Australium Prodromus. The specific epithet comans is derived from Latin, meaning "covered with hair".

References 

comans
Flora of New South Wales
Flora of Queensland
Flora of Victoria (Australia)
Flora of Tasmania
Flora of New Zealand
Plants described in 1786